Paledang is one of the areas in Central Bogor District, Bogor, West Java, Indonesia. It encompasses the Bogor Botanical Gardens and Istana, plus a bustling urban area to the west between the Gardens and the river. Bogor Paledang railway station serves the Bogor-Sukabumi route.

Because Paledang includes a busy area along the west boundary of the Bogor Botanical Garden and Istana, it has been proposed that this could act  as a "buffer zone" between the Botanical Garden and the rest of the city of Bogor.

The area includes shops, businesses, offices and several places of worship including the Roman Catholic Cathedral (BMV Katedral Bogor), the Batak Christian Protestant Church (Gereja HKBP Paledang Bogor) and several mosques including the Masjid At-Taufiq.

An innovative education programme was introduced in the Lembaga Pemasyrakatan (prison) in Paledang to address the economic and health problems that prisoners face after release, due to poverty and unemployment because of prejudice. The programme teaches about personal and family health, and tackles the inaccessibility of expensive medicines by encouraging the use of medicinal plants that can be grown at home in pots.

Photographs

References

External links
Official website: 

Populated places in West Java
Bogor